Shooting at the 2017 Summer Deaflympics took place at the Bafra Shooting Range'''.

Medal summary

Medalists

Men

Women

References

External links
 Shooting

2017 Summer Deaflympics